The Financial Services Commission (FSC) is a regulatory authority responsible for the regulation, supervision and inspection of all financial services other than banking institutions and global business in Mauritius. The FSC operates under the aegis of the Ministry of Finance and Economic Development within an internationally recognised legal framework which includes the FSC Act, the Securities Act and the Insurance Act, it licenses, regulates, monitors and supervises the conduct of business activities in the non-banking financial services sector.

References
Established in 2001, the FSC is mandated under the FSC Act 2007 and has as enabling legislations the Securities Act 2005, the Insurance Act 2005 and the Private Pension Schemes Act 2012 to license, regulate, monitor and supervise the conduct of business activities in these sectors.

Financial regulatory authorities of Mauritius
Government agencies of Mauritius
Economy of Mauritius
Government agencies established in 2001
2001 establishments in Mauritius
Ebene, Mauritius